(born 5 October 1964) is a Japanese citizen who was abducted by a North Korean agent in 1977 when she was a thirteen-year-old junior high school student. She was one of at least seventeen Japanese citizens kidnapped by North Korea in the late 1970s and early 1980s. The North Korean government has admitted to kidnapping Yokota, but has said that she died in captivity. Yokota's parents and others in Japan have publicly expressed the belief that she is still alive in North Korea and have waged a public campaign seeking her return to Japan.

History

Megumi Yokota was abducted on 15 November 1977 at the age of thirteen while walking home from school in her seaside village in Niigata Prefecture. It's believed that she was abducted because she happened to witness activities of North Korean agents in Japan and so the agents wanted to silence her. North Korean agents reportedly dragged her into a boat and took her straight to North Korea to a facility, where she was taught the Korean language. She was eventually assigned to a university where North Korean spies were taught foreign languages, customs and practices. Here she taught Japanese to spies who were being trained to infiltrate Japan. Also at the earlier facility were two South Korean high school students, aged 18 and 16, who had been abducted from South Korea in August 1977 and in August the next year, three more 16-year-old South Korean students were abducted and taken to the same facility. These included , who would reportedly later marry Yokota.

After many years of speculation and no new leads, in January 1997, information about Megumi's abduction was disclosed to Yokota's parents by Tatsukichi Hyomoto, a secretary to Diet member Atsushi Hashimoto, by a phone call. In 2002, North Korea admitted that she and others had been abducted, but claimed that she had committed suicide on March 13, 1994, and returned what it said were her cremated remains. Japan stated that a DNA test showed they could not have been her remains (although it was later discovered that a junior faculty member with no previous analysis of cremated specimens had tested the remains and may have accidentally contaminated them), and her family does not believe that she would have committed suicide. She is believed to have been abducted by Sin Gwang-su.

In the North in 1986, Yokota married a South Korean national, Kim Young-nam (Korean: 김영남, Hanja: 金英男), likely also abducted, and the couple had a daughter in 1987, Kim Hye-gyong (김혜경, whose real name was later revealed to be Kim Eun-gyong, 김은경). In June 2006, Kim Young-nam, who has since remarried, was allowed to have his family from the South visit him, and during the reunion he confirmed Yokota had committed suicide in 1994 after suffering from mental illness, and had several attempts at suicide before. He also claimed the remains returned in 2004 are genuine. His comments were however widely dismissed as repeating the official Pyongyang line, with Megumi's father claiming that Young-nam was not allowed to speak freely during his interview in Pyongyang, stating that "he was likely restricted in terms of what he can say" and that "it looked as if he were reading a script". In June 2012, Choi Seong-ryong, head of a support group for relatives of South Koreans abducted to the North, claimed that he had obtained North Korean government documents which stated that Yokota had died from "depression" on 14 December 2004. However, his claim has been dismissed by many as he refused to release the documents to the public.

It is widely believed, especially in Japan, that Yokota is still alive. In November 2011 a South Korean magazine, Weekly Chosun, stated that a 2005 directory of Pyongyang residents listed a woman, named Kim Eun-gong, with the same birth date as Yokota. The directory gave Kim's spouse's name as "Kim Yong Nam". Japanese government sources verified on 18 November 2011 that they had reviewed the directory but had yet to draw a conclusion on the identity of the woman listed. Sources later indicated that Kim Eun-gong was actually Yokota's 24-year-old daughter. In 2012, it was reported that North Korean authorities were keeping Kim under strict surveillance. In August 2012, Choi Seong-ryong stated that sources in North Korea had told him that Kim Eun-gong had been placed under the supervision of Kim Jong-un's sister, Kim Yo-jong, and that the North Korean government may be planning on using Yokota's daughter as a "card" in future negotiations with Japan. Reportedly, in 2010 the North Korean government offered to allow Yokota's parents to visit Kim Eun-gyong in a country "other than Japan" but the Japanese government and Yokota's parents were wary about the offer, suspecting it as a ploy by the North Korean government to seek an advantage in ongoing diplomatic negotiations. In March 2014, the parents of Megumi Yokota met their granddaughter Kim Eun-gyong for the first time in Mongolia, along with her own baby daughter, whose father was not identified.

DNA controversy

Yokota was alleged to have died at the age of 29. However, the death certificate provided in support of this assertion appears to have been falsified, and DNA tests on the remains said to be hers were not a positive match.

An interview in the 3 February 2005 issue of Nature revealed that the DNA analysis on Megumi's remains had been performed by a member of the medical department of Teikyo University, Yoshii Tomio. Yoshii, it later transpired, was a relatively junior faculty member, of lecturer status, in a forensic department that had neither a professor nor even an assistant professor. He said that he had no previous experience in the analysis of cremated specimens, described his tests as inconclusive, and remarked that such samples were very easily contaminated by anyone coming in contact with them, like "stiff sponges that can absorb anything". The five tiny samples he had been given to work on (the largest of them 1.5 grams) had anyway been used up in his laboratory, so independent verification was thereafter impossible.

When the Japanese government's Chief Cabinet Secretary, Hiroyuki Hosoda, referred to this article as inadequate and a misrepresentation of the government-commissioned analysis, Nature responded in an editorial (17 March), saying that:

Media attention

Documentaries made about Megumi and the other kidnapping cases include: KIDNAPPED! The Japan-North Korea Abduction Cases (2005),  Abduction: The Megumi Yokota Story (2006), Megumi (2007), and Megumi (2008). In October 2006 a special aired on Japan television titled Reunion ~ Megumi Yokota's Wish (Saikai ~Yokota Megumi-san no Negai~; 再会～横田めぐみさんの願い). It starred Mayuko Fukuda as a young Yokota, and Nana Katase as grown Yokota.

Yokota's parents supervised the creation of a serial manga, one titled Megumi detailing her last days in Japan before her abduction, and another titled Dakkan about returned victim Kaoru Hasuike. The Japanese government produced an anime adaption of the manga.

In 2010, the Shinjuku Theater has performed a stage adaptation of Megumi's life called "The Pledge to Megumi" (めぐみへの誓い) The main storyline centers on Megumi Yokota before and during her abduction by North Korea, and with a fictional ending where Megumi is reunited with her parents.

On October 10, 2011, Japan Today reported a defector had asserted that Yokota was still alive, but that she was not allowed to leave North Korea because she was in possession of sensitive information.

In October 2011, South Korean intelligence agencies reported they believed dozens of South Korean and Japanese abduction victims were moved to Wonhwa-ri in South Pyongan Province; this group may have included Yokota, Yaeko Taguchi, and Tadaaki Hara.

On September 19, 2017, President of the United States Donald Trump, in a speech to the United Nations General Assembly, included Yokota in a series of accusations against the North Korean government, saying, "We know it kidnapped a sweet 13-year-old Japanese girl from a beach in her own country to enslave her as a language tutor for North Korea's spies."  Yokota's mother Sakie said, "I was really surprised, but it was great, and I'm thankful to (Trump) for bringing up the issue and putting it into words in front of those representatives from around the world. Every word on the issue is a chance. I believe (Trump's words) had a profound significance to the issue." It was reported that President Trump sent a letter expressing his condolences to Sakie over the death of her husband Shigeru Yokota, who died on June 5, 2020, at the age of 87.

Songs about Yokota
In early 2007, Paul Stookey (of U.S. folk group Peter, Paul and Mary) introduced a song dedicated to Megumi, titled "Song for Megumi". Stookey toured Japan to sing the song in February and attended media interviews with Yokota's parents.

In 2010, British rock singer Peter Frampton recorded two songs about Megumi Yokota after watching the documentary Abduction: The Megumi Yokota Story on PBS. Titled "Asleep at the Wheel" and "Suite Liberte", the songs are part of his album, Thank You, Mr. Churchill.

TV movie
In 2006, Nippon Television (NTV) aired Saikai -Yokota Megumi-san no Negai- (再会 ~横田めぐみさんの願い~   Reunion ~Yokota Megumi's Wish~) a television film about the life of Megumi Yokota. The movie starred Mayuko Fukuda and Nana Katase as Yokota during different periods in her life.

See also
List of people who disappeared
Kim Hyon-hui
North Korean abductions of Japanese
North Korean abductions of South Koreans
POW/MIA
North Korea Kidnapped My Daughter

References

Sources
"Tokyo ‘Hiding Knowledge of Megumi Yokota’s Death’", The Chosun Ilbo, August 17, 2006.
"Until The Day We Sing Together", mylessenex.com, March 24, 2003.
"Accounted For, At Last", Time (Asia), September 24, 2002.
"Clues Found in North Korean Kidnappings", The Dong-a Ilbo, January 7, 2006.
"U.S. folk star writes song about abductee Yokota", The Japan Times, February 16, 2007.
"Parental love versus Kim Jong-il", By Kosuke Takahashi of Asia Times Online, April 28, 2009.

External links
ABDUCTION: The Megumi Yokota Story  site for Independent Lens on PBS
Blogs.wsj.com, Peter Frampton records two songs for Megumi
KIDNAPPED! The Japan-North Korea Abduction Cases Interview with director Melissa K. Lee
 
The abduction of Japanese nationals by North Korea, National Association for the Rescue of Japanese Kidnapped by North Korea (NARKN), Japanese support group for the families of the abducted victims
Until They Took Her Away

1964 births
1970s missing person cases
1977 crimes in Japan
Kidnapped Japanese children
Missing Japanese children
Missing person cases in Japan
North Korean abductions of Japanese citizens
People from Niigata Prefecture
People of Shōwa-period Japan
Possibly living people